Rashtriya Ispat Nigam Ltd, (abbreviated as RINL), also known as Vizag Steel, is a public steel producer based in Visakhapatnam, India. Rashtriya Ispat Nigam Limited (RINL) is the corporate entity of Visakhapatnam Steel Plant (VSP), India's first shore-based integrated steel plant built with state-of-the-art technology. Visakhapatnam Steel Plant (VSP) is a 7.3 MTPA plant. It was commissioned in 1992 with a capacity of 3.0 MTPA of liquid steel. The company subsequently completed its capacity expansion to 6.3 MTPA in April 2015 and to 7.3 MTPA in December 2017. The company is having one subsidiary, viz. Eastern Investment Limited (EIL) with 51% shareholding, which in turn is having two subsidiaries, viz. M/s Orissa Mineral Development Company Ltd (OMDC) and M/s Bisra Stone Lime Company Ltd (BSLC). The company has a partnership in RINMOIL Ferro Alloys Private Limited and International Coal Ventures Limited in the form of Joint Ventures with 50% and 26.49% shareholding respectively.

Location
The steel plant is in the southern part of Visakhapatnam city, Andhra Pradesh state of India. The company has blast furnace grade Limestone captive mine at Jaggayyapeta (Krishna District), a captive mine for Dolomite at Madharam (Khammam), a manganese ore captive mine at Cheepurupalli (Vizianagaram). It also has a mining lease for river sand on the river Champavathi.

History
RINL was wholly owned by the Government of India. In November 2010, the company was granted the Navratna status by the Government of India.
In September 2011, the government announced plans to divest 10% of its stake in RINL via an initial public offering. In February 2021, the Cabinet approved the privatisation of steel-maker Rashtriya Ispat Nigam Ltd (RINL). This decision caused massive protests in Vizag city.

Operations
RINL operates a 7.3 million tonne per annum capacity steel plant in Visakhapatnam. During the initial periods, the company suffered huge losses. Later the profits have gone up by 200% making it the only steel industry to achieve such a target. Its annual capacity is expected to reach almost 7.5 million tonnes by 2020.
RINL plans to invest  to increase the capacity to 20 million tonnes by 2027.

References

Steel companies of India
Companies based in Visakhapatnam
Manufacturing companies established in 1982
Economy of Visakhapatnam
Indian companies established in 1982
Recipients of the Rashtriya Khel Protsahan Puruskar